Karađorđe's schnitzel (/Karađorđeva šnicla) is a Serbian breaded cutlet dish named after the Serbian revolutionary Karađorđe. It is a rolled veal or pork steak, stuffed with kajmak, and then breaded and fried. It is served with roasted potatoes and tartar sauce.

The steak is sometimes colloquially referred to as the maidens' dream (девојачки сан/devojački san), because of its phallic shape.

The dish is a modern invention, created by chef Mića Stojanović in 1959 who, when he needed to prepare Chicken Kiev for a distinguished visitor from the Soviet Union, was faced with lack of poultry. He used veal instead of chicken. However, not fully satisfied with the result, he poured tartar sauce over it, and decorated it with a slice of lemon and pieces of tomato, which at the end resembled the medal of the Order of the Star of Karađorđe, and thus the steak was named.

See also
 Dishes à la Maréchale
 Schnitzel cordon bleu
 Cachopo
 List of stuffed dishes

References

Breaded cutlets
Serbian cuisine
Veal dishes
Pork dishes
Stuffed dishes